KdtA may refer to:

 Lipid IVA 3-deoxy-D-manno-octulosonic acid transferase, an enzyme
 (KDO)2-lipid IVA (2-8) 3-deoxy-D-manno-octulosonic acid transferase, an enzyme
 (KDO)3-lipid IVA (2-4) 3-deoxy-D-manno-octulosonic acid transferase, an enzyme